Martin Senore (born 6 May 1968 in Pretoria) is a South African sport shooter. He has been selected to compete for South Africa in small-bore rifle shooting at the 2004 Summer Olympics, and has achieved a total of two medals, a gold and a bronze, at two editions of the African Championships. Senore trains full-time at Eagle Eye Shooting Centre in Pretoria under his longtime coach Hubert Bichler.

Senore qualified as a sole shooter for the South African squad in the men's 50 m rifle prone at the 2004 Summer Olympics in Athens. He managed to get a minimum qualifying score of 597 to fill in the Olympic quota place for South Africa, which was previously awarded to his brother Fred Senore, following his fourth-place feat at the ISSF World Cup meet in Munich, Germany. Senore recorded a lowly 588 out of a possible 600 from his 60 shots to occupy a thirty-ninth position in a vast field of forty-six shooters, failing to advance to the final.

References

External links

Olympic Athlete Bio at News24.com

1968 births
Living people
South African male sport shooters
Olympic shooters of South Africa
Shooters at the 2004 Summer Olympics
Shooters at the 2006 Commonwealth Games
Commonwealth Games competitors for South Africa
Sportspeople from Pretoria
21st-century South African people